Ranganayaki, also known by her epithet Tayar, is a Hindu goddess. She is the presiding goddess of the Sri Ranganathaswamy temple at Srirangam. She is the chief consort of Ranganatha, the tutelary deity of Srirangam. The goddess is regarded as a manifestation of Lakshmi, while Ranganatha is considered as a manifestation of Vishnu. She is also called Ranganayaki Nachiyar and Periya Piratti.

Ranganayaki is venerated by the people of Srirangam and by Vaishnavas, the adherents of Vishnu. According to Sri Vaishnava tradition, she is regarded co-equal to Ranganatha himself, considered to be both the means and the end of worship to the divine couple.

Temple
The shrine of the Ranganathaswamy temple has two main idols (mula murtis) and one processional idol (utsava murti), due to the fact that the processional idol was buried under a tree near her shrine during the invasion of the temple by Malik Kafur of the Khalji Dynasty in the year 1323 CE. A wall was erected and her murti was moved from her shrine so that it would not be desecrated. After the plunder, the idol was not found, and the priest of the shrine hastily ordered for a new idol to be created. This idol was the second main idol (mula murti) in the shrine. According to local legend, the goddess appeared in a dream of a devotee and told him where her procession idol (utsava murti) was. The idol was dug up by the devotee and re-installed. Unlike other temples, the processional idol of Ranganayaki never leaves her sanctum (garbhagriha). It is a temple custom that the goddess of the temple takes her place beside the god of the temple during processions. In Srirangam, however, the processional idol of Ranganatha is ritually carried by adherents to her sanctum, symbolically representing a husband visiting his beloved.

Once a year, on the occasion of Panguni Uttiram, the day in the Tamil month of Panguni when the star Uttiram is in ascension, the divine procession idols (utsava murtis) of Ranganatha and Ranganayaki, come together for a day. They are known together as the divya-dampatigal, (divine couple) existing beyond mortal confines or limitations. Due to this reason, this temple does not have a Tirukalyana-utsavam (wedding festival). This darshana is called serti-sevai (joint service).

The shloka called the Sri Gunaratna Kosam composed by Parasara Bhattar is dedicated to Ranganayaki. However, the traditional Lakshmi Ashstotram is recited in the temple during rituals. The Sri Stuti composed by Vedanta Desika and Kanakadhara Stotram written by Adi Shankaracharya are chanted by devotees of the temple in her praise.

References 

Lakshmi
Hindu goddesses
Tamil mythology